Tarek Boudali (born 5 November 1979) is a French actor and humorist of Moroccan origin.

Life and career

Tarek Boudali, of Moroccan origin, graduated with a Higher Technician Certificate (BTS) Sales Force. In 2012, he joined the cast of the M6 series En famille, where he plays the role of Kader, a young father. He then had film success with Babysitting, released in 2014.

He is part of La Bande à Fifi, a French comedy troupe bringing together Philippe Lacheau, Élodie Fontan, Tarek Boudali, Reem Kherici and Julien Arruti.

In 2018, he joined the Les Enfoirés.

Filmography

Feature films

Television

References

External links

 

1979 births
Living people
French male film actors
French male television actors
French comedians
21st-century French male actors
French screenwriters